J. W. "Gunboat" Thompson was an American Negro league pitcher between 1913 and 1920.

Thompson made his Negro leagues debut in 1913 with the Cuban Giants. He went on to play for the Lincoln Stars, Chicago American Giants, and Detroit Stars.

References

External links
 and Baseball-Reference Black Baseball stats and Seamheads

Year of birth missing
Year of death missing
Place of birth missing
Place of death missing
Chicago American Giants players
Cuban Giants players
Detroit Stars players
Lincoln Stars (baseball) players
Baseball pitchers